Bucur LF is a series of low-floor tram vehicles produced by the URAC section of the STB (formerly RATB) transit company of Bucharest, Romania. The tram is configured as a three-section 65% low floor vehicle, with two powered and one unpowered bogies.

The first deliveries for STB started in 2009. Initially, the trams were manufactured in the LF-CH version, with direct current motors with chopper, and since 2012 in the LF-CA version, with inverter and alternating current motors. A five-section vehicle design of 100% low floor and  length was also proposed as Bucur LF2.

Product list

References

External links

 Manufacturer's website page

URAC trams
Tram vehicles of Romania
Transport in Bucharest